The 1998 24 Hours of Le Mans was the 66th Grand Prix of Endurance, and took place on 6 and 7 June 1998.

Schedule
Events for the 24 Hours of Le Mans began on 2 May with technical inspections, before initial pre-qualifying on 3 May. The race week began on Monday 1 June with renewed technical inspections.

Entries
1998 saw a significant increase in manufacturer involvement.  Porsche and Mercedes-Benz remained, with upgraded cars in both GT1 and LMP.  Toyota sent three of their new, extremely fast GT-One racing cars, while BMW, in association with WilliamsF1, launched the new BMW V12 LM.  Nissan sent 4 of their new R390 GT1s.  The United States was also represented properly with a two car team from Panoz, with Ford powered Esperante GTR-1s, and factory-backed Chrysler Viper GTS-R in the GT2 class entered by Oreca.

Automatic invitations
Automatic entry to the 1998 24 Hours of Le Mans was granted to teams that had performed well in the previous year's 24 Hours of Le Mans, as well as the 1997 season of the FIA GT Championship and the Le Mans Autumn Cup. Entries with a blue background were granted entries, but did not accept their invitations.

1. Joest Racing forfeited their automatic inclusion by racing under the works Porsche team (car number 7).

Scrutineering
A total of 63 entries, including those already automatically qualified, were presented for scrutineering on Saturday, May 2. 61 cars passed the scrutineering checks, but two entries - the #37 Newcastle United Lister Storm and the #59 Pilbeam Racing Designs Lotus Esprit, were denied on technical grounds. With no time to effect the necessary changes both entries would be unable to take part in pre-qualifying for the race.

Pre-qualifying
Pre-qualifying for the 1998 24 Hours of Le Mans took place on Sunday, May 3. The entries were divided into two groups of qualifiers where the slowest entries in each class would be eliminated and thus not qualify for the race. A total of 49 starting slots were available for the entered cars, including those already automatically pre-qualified, and were divided on a session- and class-basis. The pre-qualifying results were as follows:

Morning session (7:30 a.m. - 1:30 p.m.)

It was an expectedly tight session for the GT1 cars, with 7 strong entries competing for 5 slots on the grid. In the end it was the unfortunate Larbre and Zakspeed entries that were out of luck despite trying hard with in the case of number 38 spectacular moments. Slowest of all in GT1 was the GTC McLaren with the Mercedes (which had a stop on the Mulsanne at 12:30, reason unknown) splitting the two non pre-qualifiers.

In LMP1 8 entries battled for 6 slots on the grid, with the Moretti Ferrari setting the fastest time. The non-qualifiers were the number 17 Kremer K8 (4:02) and the WR (3:56) which suffered a spin into the gravel trap at the Dunlop curve early in the session. Slowest of the LMP1 cars was the already-qualified Courage #24.

The GT2 group consisted of 11 entries competing for 8 slots. The lone LMP2 entry to the race, the #22 Debora, had been grouped into this category in the absence of any other competition. The predicted Oreca Viper benefit, 4.3 seconds clear of the fastest 911 GT2. The non-qualifiers were two 911 GT2's and the Helem PRV V6.

Note: Pink background denotes non-qualifiers, green background denotes entries automatically pre-qualified.

Afternoon session (2:30 p.m. - 8:30 p.m.)

The afternoon session saw the final 9 GT1 entries competing for the remaining 7 slots on the grid. Fastest overall and in GT1 was the number 26 Porsche in the hands of Allan McNish after a titanic battle with Martin Brundle's Toyota in the closing hour, the difference ending up at only 0.09 seconds. The two who go no further in GT1 for this session were Hybrid Panoz and the second Zakspeed Porsche (meaning neither Zakspeed entry made it through to the race). The two Nissans (one TWR, one Nova) and the 'conventional' Panoz made it comfortably, despite the #33 Nova Nissan spinning into a gravel trap after only 10 minutes of the session, later resuming with the spare rear bodywork from one of the TWR cars.

In LMP1 there were 9 entries competing for 7 slots. Again a Ferrari was fastest, as the JB Ferrari beat the factory BMW and Porsche entries with 0.4 and 2.7 seconds respectively. The second Kremer K8 scraped home ahead of the Konrad K8 by 0.08 seconds and thus made the race. The other prototype not to progress was the other WR which never managed to set a competitive laptime.

GT2 was again dominated by the Oreca Vipers. 8 of the 10 entries would make it through, with the two non-qualifiers being the second Cirtek Mustang and the third Roock Racing 911 GT2.

Note: Pink background denotes non-qualifiers, green background denotes entries automatically pre-qualified.

Reserve entries
The entries which failed to pre-qualify were placed on a reserve list, in case an entry from the list of 48 withdrew prior to the event. These entries were allowed to join the race entry list based on the fastest pre-qualifying times from the same group and class as the withdrawn entry.

Before the race, two LMGT2 entries from the first pre-qualifying session were withdrawn. First to be withdrawn was the lone Cirtek Mustang which had qualified, which promoted the #65 Roock Racing 911 GT2 into the race. Secondly Viper Team Oreca, which had a total of four Vipers qualified for the race including their automatic entry, withdrew Viper #52. This promoted the #58 RJ Racing Helem into the race.

Qualifying
Of the 48 cars entered for the race 47 would take part in practice and qualifying. The Helem V6, which had been promoted following the withdrawal of the #52 Viper, ultimately failed race week scrutineering checks because of non-complying structural differences between the road car and the competition one entered in the 24 Hours. After barely scraping through on a reserve entry the car would thus not be allowed to take any further part in race proceedings.

Qualifying took place over a combined four sessions held on Wednesday and Thursday evening, with the fastest times set at any time across all sessions determining the starting grid for the race.

Qualifying results
Class leaders are in bold.

Race

Porsche won the race as the faster cars from Mercedes, BMW and Toyota retired with mechanical difficulties and accident damage.  The remaining Nissans and outdated McLarens were unable to match the pace of the upgraded 911 GT1s.  Following this race, Porsche went into a sabbatical, rumored to be part of a plan to allow Porsche's partner Audi to develop their own sportscar without competition from within the alliance.

Porsche would return to Le Mans in 2014; they would eventually win the 2015 race.

The GT2 class win by the Chrysler Viper GTS-R was the first GT class win for an American made car since the Shelby Daytona Coupe won in 1964.

Official results

Statistics
 Pole Position - #35 AMG-Mercedes - 3:35.544
 Fastest Lap - #28 Toyota Motorsport - 3:41.809
 Distance - 4783.78 km
 Average Speed - 199.324 km/h
 Highest Trap Speed — Toyota GT-One - 345 km/h (practice)

References

Le Mans
24 Hours of Le Mans
24 Hours of Le Mans races